Donna Marie Fick is an American nurse.

She obtained a bachelor's degree in nursing science at Berea College before earning a master's degree from the University of Cincinnati. Subsequently, Fick completed a doctorate at the University of California, San Francisco. She is the Elouise Ross Eberly Professor of Nursing at Pennsylvania State University and editor of the Journal of Gerontological Nursing.

References

Living people
Year of birth missing (living people)
Pennsylvania State University faculty
Berea College alumni
University of California, San Francisco alumni
University of Cincinnati alumni
Academic journal editors
American women nurses
American women academics
21st-century American women